A space tornado is a solar windstorm and is exceptionally larger and more powerful than conventional tornadoes on Earth. They are also thought to produce the aurora borealis phenomenon.

Tornadoes on Earth are formed within the atmosphere by thunderstorms, while space tornadoes are formed by plasma interacting with magnetic fields.

Characteristics
Within its funnel, they also generate strong electrical currents of about 100,000 amperes. Space tornadoes form roughly every three hours and take only a minute to reach the Ionosphere. Power transformers and other man-made constructs are susceptible to damage from space tornadoes.

Discovery

Much of what is understood about space tornadoes was obtained through a NASA mission called Time History of Events and Macroscale Interactions during Substorms (THEMIS), which deployed several probes to measure the strength of the electrical currents, size, and velocity of the rotating plasma.

See also

Space hurricane
Earth's magnetic field
Solar wind

References

Solar phenomena
Space weather
Storms